Ronald Futcher (born 25 September 1956) is an English former footballer who played as a centre-forward. He was the fourth highest career scorer of the North American Soccer League, and made over 400 appearances in total for nine different English Football League clubs. He was noted for his aerial ability and solid ball control.

He began his career at Chester, before moving on to Luton Town the following year. He signed with Manchester City in August 1978, but left Maine Road the following year to concentrate on his career in the United States with the Minnesota Kicks. After the club disbanded he moved on to Portland Timbers and then the Tulsa Roughnecks, winning the Soccer Bowl in 1983. The next year he returned to England with Barnsley, following a brief spell with Dutch side NAC Breda. He signed with Oldham Athletic in 1985, and then transferred to Bradford City in 1987. He was bought by Port Vale in August 1988 for £35,000, and helped the "Valiants" to win promotion out of the Third Division via the play-offs in 1989. He was sold on to Burnley for £60,000 in November 1989, before moving on to Crewe Alexandra. He announced his retirement the next year, after a brief spell in the Conference with Boston United.

Playing career
Futcher started his professional career with hometown club Chester in the Fourth Division, appearing in four first-team games under Ken Roberts in 1973–74. He moved with twin brother Paul on to Harry Haslam's Luton Town for a joint £125,000 fee in June 1974. He scored seven goals in 17 games in the First Division relegation campaign in 1974–75, including a hat-trick against Wolverhampton Wanderers. The "Hatters" remained in the Second Division in 1975–76. He bagged 13 goals in 1976–77 to become the club's joint-top scorer (with Jimmy Husband). He hit 10 goals in 1977–78, as did Phil Boersma, to again become the club's joint-highest scorer. He left Kenilworth Road after David Pleat was appointed manager. In August 1978, Futcher transferred back to the top-flight with Manchester City and played at Maine Road for the 1978–79 campaign, scoring seven goals in 17 league games for Tony Book. This included a hat-trick in a 4–1 win over Chelsea at Stamford Bridge on 17 September.

Futcher began playing summers in the North American Soccer League in 1976 with the Minnesota Kicks, spending the next five seasons with the team. The Kicks reached the Soccer Bowl in 1976 under manager Freddie Goodwin, where they were beaten by Toronto Metros-Croatia. They reached the Conference semi-finals in 1977, losing to the Seattle Sounders. They again reached the semi-finals in 1978, losing to the New York Cosmos. In 1979, they lost in the First Round of the play-offs to the Tulsa Roughnecks, costing coach Roy McCrohan his job. They again lost out at the First Round in 1980 under returning manager Freddie Goodwin, losing to Dallas Tornado. The 1981 season was his last at the Metropolitan Stadium, as Kicks lost at the quarter-finals to Fort Lauderdale Strikers under Geoff Barnett. Having been with the Minnesota Kicks from the club's founding in 1976, he remained with the club until it closed in 1981.

He played with the Portland Timbers in the summer of 1982, becoming the club's top scorer with 13 goals, including a hat-trick against the Vancouver Whitecaps. He also spent a brief period in early 1983 back in England with Southampton, without making any first–team appearances. He moved on to the Tulsa Roughnecks, scoring the second goal in a 1983 2–0 win over Toronto in the Soccer Bowl at BC Place despite having initially being suspended following a red card in the previous game. However 1984 proved a disappointing campaign, and he then left the United States for good. He finished with 296 points in 201 career games in the league, including 119 goals.

Returning to Europe, Futcher had a spell with NAC Breda in the Netherlands, scoring three goals in seven Eerste Divisie games in 1983–84. Futcher then headed back to the English Second Division with Barnsley in 1984–85 on a £12,000 transfer. He joined league rivals Oldham Athletic after being signed by Joe Royle for a £5,000 fee, and became the club's top scorer in 1985–86 with 17 goals. The "Latics" reached the play-offs in 1986–87, but were beaten by Leeds United in the semi-finals. He then left Boundary Park and was signed by Terry Dolan at Bradford City for £40,000, and scored 19 goals in 38 games in 1987–88 to become the "Bantams" top scorer. Bradford lost to Middlesbrough in the Second Division play-off semi-finals, despite a 2–1 victory in the first leg at Valley Parade.

In August 1988, Port Vale manager John Rudge paid £35,000 for his services, having tried unsuccessfully to sign a total of five other strikers. Futcher bagged 19 goals in 54 appearances in the 1988–89 season, including a strike from over 30-yards out in a 6–1 victory over Cardiff City. He played in both legs of the Third Division play-off final victory over Bristol Rovers, setting up Robbie Earle for the first goal of a 2–1 aggregate victory. However he was dropped in October 1989, after losing his spot to new signing Nicky Cross in 1989–90, and he 'forced the issue' and was sold on to Fourth Division Burnley for £60,000 the following month. He hit 10 goals in 30 games for Frank Casper's "Clarets" in 1989–90 to become the club's top scorer. With a full season at Turf Moor in 1990–91, he was the club's top scorer with 20 goals in 43 games, as Burnley reached the play-offs, where they were beaten by Torquay United.

He left Burnley in July 1991 and moved on to Crewe Alexandra, scoring four goals in 21 league games in 1991–92. Dario Gradi's "Railwaymen" reached the Fourth Division play-offs, where they were beaten by Scunthorpe United. He later played two Conference games for Boston United in 1992–93 before he retired.

Style of play
Futcher was a striker with cool finishing skills and footballing intelligence, but a distinct lack of pace.

Coaching career
As a coach, he has been involved in college soccer in America, including at Oakland University. He has previously worked as Bradford City's Community Officer and Youth Development Officer.

Personal life
Futcher's twin brother Paul played over 20 years in the Football League, and Paul's son Ben also has extensive Football League experience. Ron's other brother Graham also played professionally. Paul and Graham also started their careers with Chester City. He is also the uncle of former Premier League midfielder Danny Murphy.

Career statistics
Source:

Honours
Minnesota Kicks
Soccer Bowl runner-up: 1976

Tulsa Roughnecks
Soccer Bowl: 1983

Port Vale
Football League Third Division play-offs: 1989

References

1956 births
Sportspeople from Chester
Living people
English footballers
Association football forwards
Chester City F.C. players
Luton Town F.C. players
Manchester City F.C. players
English expatriate footballers
English expatriate sportspeople in the United States
Expatriate soccer players in the United States
Minnesota Kicks players
Portland Timbers (1975–1982) players
Southampton F.C. players
Tulsa Roughnecks (1978–1984) players
English expatriate sportspeople in the Netherlands
Expatriate footballers in the Netherlands
NAC Breda players
Eerste Divisie players
Barnsley F.C. players
Oldham Athletic A.F.C. players
Bradford City A.F.C. players
Port Vale F.C. players
Burnley F.C. players
Crewe Alexandra F.C. players
Boston United F.C. players
English Football League players
North American Soccer League (1968–1984) indoor players
North American Soccer League (1968–1984) players